Melincourt could refer to:

 Melincourt, Haute-Saône, a French commune
 Melincourt, Neath Port Talbot, a location in the community of Clyne and Melincourt, South Wales
 Melincourt Falls, a waterfall and nature reserve
 Melincourt (novel), a novel by Thomas Love Peacock